Indianapolis Brewing Company (IBC) was a brewery in Indianapolis, Indiana, in the United States. The brewery opened in 1887 and closed in 1948. During its existence, it won medals at the 1900 Paris Exposition and the St. Louis World’s Fair. The brewery operated during Prohibition, producing tonic and malt extract.

History

The Indianapolis Brewing Company was founded in 1887 in Indianapolis, Indiana. The company was formed by the merger of three Indianapolis breweries: C.F. Schmidt Brewing Company, Casper Maus Brewery, and P. Lieber Brewing Company City Brewery. These three companies operated as breweries under the IBC name. The main brewery was the P. Lieber property. IBC was the largest brewery in the state and operated its own rail line to deliver beer. 

The C. F. Schmidt Brewery was originally founded in 1858 by Christian Frederick Schmidt and Charles Jaeger. It was located at the current site of Eli Lilly and Company's headquarters. Their best selling beers were lagers. The C. F. Schmidt Brewery closed on May 27, 1920.

In 1933, after Prohibition, IBC changed its name to Indiana Breweries, Inc. In 1935, they returned to using Indianapolis Brewing Company name. In 1948, IBC president Lawrence Barden was found guilty of under-filling beer bottles. He went to jail and IBC went bankrupt.

Products

The brewery produced various beers, including Derbey, Progress, Burgomaster, Pilsner Club, Indiana Club, Crown Select, Lieber’s Gold Metal Beer, Circle City, and more. Their Duesseldorfer was their most award-winning beer, winning awards at the 1900 Paris Exposition and the St. Louis World’s Fair. 

Aside from beer, the brewery also produced non-alcoholic malt extracts and a beverage called Ozotonic. These items became the breweries sole focus during Prohibition from 1920 until 1933.

Legacy

The papers of the Indianapolis Brewing Company in the collection of the Indiana State Library.

Further reading
Morris, Derrick, and Ostrander, Bob. Hoosier Beer: Tapping Into Indiana Brewing History. United States, Arcadia Publishing Incorporated, 2011. ISBN 9781614234265

See also

List of breweries in Indiana

References

1887 establishments in Indiana
1948 disestablishments in Indiana
American companies established in 1887
Food and drink companies established in 1887
American companies disestablished in 1948
Bankrupt companies of the United States
Beer brewing companies based in Indiana
Defunct companies based in Indianapolis